Fjågesund Church is a parish church of the Church of Norway in Kviteseid Municipality in Vestfold og Telemark county, Norway. It is located in the village of Fjågasund. It is one of the churches in the Kviteseid parish which is part of the Øvre Telemark prosti (deanery) in the Diocese of Agder og Telemark. The brown, wooden church was built in a long church design in 1916 using plans drawn up by the architect Haldor Larsen Børve. The church seats about 108 people.

History

The Old Kviteseid Church served the parish of Kviteseid for centuries. The old church was located in the central part of the parish. In 1869, the parish priest moved from the old rectory by the church to a new rectory in the village. In the late 1800s, it was decided to move the Kviteseid Church to the village of Kviteseid, and to compensate for moving it further to the northwest, the parish would also build a brand new church at Fjågesund to serve the eastern part of the parish. Because of the small size of the parish, it took many years to raise the money needed to construct both new churches.

Haldor Larsen Børve was hired to design the new church. The new church is a wooden long church, obviously inspired by the look of the historic stave churches in Norway. The new Fjågesund Chapel was consecrated on 19 June 1916 (the day after the new Kviteseid Church was consecrated). In 1997, the chapel was renamed Fjågesund Church.

See also
List of churches in Agder og Telemark

References

Kviteseid
Churches in Vestfold og Telemark
Long churches in Norway
Wooden churches in Norway
20th-century Church of Norway church buildings
Churches completed in 1916
1916 establishments in Norway